Toman is a surname of German and Czech origin.

Notable people with the name include:
Toman (actor) (born 1993), Japanese actor and model

Notable people with the surname include:
Anna Toman (born 1993), English field hockey player 
Andy Toman (born 1962), English footballer 
Cyril Toman, political activist in Northern Ireland
Ioan Toman (born 1959), Romanian skeet shooter
Ivo Toman (born 1966), Czech entrepreneur and author
Jim Toman (born 1961), American college baseball coach
Jiří Toman (1938–2020), Czech-born Swiss jurist and professor
Karel Toman (1877–1946), Czech poet
Karl Toman (1884–1950), Austrian politician and trade unionist
Ladislav Toman (volleyball) (1934–2018), Czech volleyball player
Ladislav Toman (sculptor) (1894–1935), Czech sculptor
Lovro Toman (1827–1870), Slovenian revolutionary activist
Marina Toman (born 1972), Serbian politician
Milan Toman (born 1979), Czech ice hockey player
Ron Toman (1934–2011), American football player and coach
Toby Toman, British drummer
Urban Toman (born 1997), Slovenian volleyball player
Wilf Toman (1874–1917), English footballer

Slavic-language surnames
Czech-language surnames
German-language surnames
Germanic-language surnames
Surnames of Czech origin
Surnames of Silesian origin

cs:Toman